{{Drugbox
| Verifiedfields = changed
| Watchedfields = changed
| verifiedrevid = 462093427
| IUPAC_name = N-(2-Chloroethyl)-''N-cyclohexyl-N-nitrosourea
| image = Lomustine.svg
| width = 200
| image2 = Lomustine ball-and-stick model.png
| width2 = 175

| tradename = Gleostine
| Drugs.com = 
| MedlinePlus = a682207
| pregnancy_AU = D
| pregnancy_US = D
| legal_AU = S4
| legal_CA = Rx-only
| legal_UK = POM
| legal_US = Rx-only
| routes_of_administration = Oral (capsules)

| bioavailability = ~100%
| protein_bound = 50%
| metabolism = Liver
| metabolites = Monoxydroxylated metabolites, trans-4-hydroxy-CCNU, cis-4-hydroxy-CCNU 
| elimination_half-life = 16–48 hours (metabolites)

| IUPHAR_ligand = 7214
| CAS_number_Ref = 
| CAS_number = 13010-47-4
| ATC_prefix = L01
| ATC_suffix = AD02
| ATC_supplemental =  
| PubChem = 3950
| DrugBank_Ref = 
| DrugBank = DB01206
| ChemSpiderID_Ref = 
| ChemSpiderID = 3813
| UNII_Ref = 
| UNII = 7BRF0Z81KG
| KEGG_Ref = 
| KEGG = D00363
| ChEBI_Ref = 
| ChEBI = 6520
| ChEMBL_Ref = 
| ChEMBL = 514

| C=9 | H=16 | Cl=1 | N=3 | O=2
| smiles = O=C(NC1CCCCC1)N(N=O)CCCl
| StdInChI_Ref = 
| StdInChI = 1S/C9H16ClN3O2/c10-6-7-13(12-15)9(14)11-8-4-2-1-3-5-8/h8H,1-7H2,(H,11,14)
| StdInChIKey_Ref = 
| StdInChIKey = GQYIWUVLTXOXAJ-UHFFFAOYSA-N
| synonyms = 1-(2-chloroethyl)-3-cyclohexyl-1-nitrosourea
| melting_point     = 90
}}Lomustine (INN); abbreviated as CCNU; original brand name CeeNU, now marketed as Gleostine''') is an alkylating nitrosourea compound used in chemotherapy. It is closely related to semustine and is in the same family as streptozotocin. It is a highly lipid-soluble drug, thus it crosses the blood–brain barrier. This property makes it ideal for treating brain tumors, which is its primary use, although it is also used to treat Hodgkin lymphoma as a second-line option. Lomustine has a long time to nadir (the time when white blood cells reach their lowest number).

Unlike carmustine, lomustine is administered orally. It is a bifunctional alkylating agent, alkylates both DNA and RNA, has the ability to created interstrand cross-links (ICLs) in DNA. As with other nitrosoureas, it may also inhibit several key enzymatic processes by carbamoylation of amino acids in proteins. Lomustine is cell-cycle nonspecific.

It has also been used in veterinary practice as a treatment for mast cell tumors in dogs.

Price increase

In the U.S., the patent for lomustine has expired, but only one company manufactures it. In 2013, Bristol-Myers Squibb Co. sold its CeeNU brand of lomustine to CordenPharma, a subsidiary of International Chemical Investors S.E., which markets it as Gleostine through NextSource Biotechnology. In 2013, BMS charged $50 a capsule. In 2018, NextSource charged $768 a capsule. Some doctors said the price increase made it unaffordable, and one doctor called it "price gouging."

References

External links 
 CeeNu (lomustine) Capsules data sheet published by the FDA
 
 

Alkylating antineoplastic agents
IARC Group 2A carcinogens
Nitrosamines
Nitrosoureas
Organochlorides
Cancer treatments
Cyclohexyl compounds
Chloroethyl compounds